is a former Japanese football player.

Club statistics

References

External links

j-league

1988 births
Living people
Association football people from Hyōgo Prefecture
Japanese footballers
J2 League players
Japan Football League players
Fagiano Okayama players
Association football midfielders